The Pineville Expressway is a four-lane controlled-access freeway that extends from I-49 in Alexandria through Pineville. It carries US 167 for all of its length, but also carries US 71 and LA 28 for some distance also. It follows the original routing of LA 3026 for some distance, as the highway has been extended over time. It also serves as a bypass around the residential areas of Pineville and Tioga.

History
Construction of the Pineville Expressway began in 1963.  It would later be incorporated into US 167. It originally carried four lanes of LA 3026 across the Red River on a lift bridge, carrying the highway along a railroad line, past Louisiana College, and around Pineville to meet US 165.

Later in the 1970s, the Pineville Expressway connected north, bypassing Tioga and ending just south of the Grant Parish line. U.S. 167 and U.S. 71 were rerouted onto this alignment, with the old road through Tioga becoming LA 3225.

Exit list

Louisiana Highway 3026

Louisiana Highway 3026 (LA 3026) was a state highway in Louisiana that served Rapides Parish. Running from Pineville to Tioga, it has been superseded by US 167.

LA 3026 began at an intersection with LA 28, which took over the lower half of the Pineville Expressway. LA 3026 was the slow extension of the Expressway, built in segments to meet US 165, and was pushed forward to meet US 71 and US 167. Once LA 3026 was extended around Tioga to meet LA 3225, US 71/167 was moved onto the alignment. US 71 remained on the alignment from US 165 through the VA complex, while US 167 was shifted completely, deleting the designation of LA 3026 in 1978.

References

See also

Transportation in Louisiana
Freeways in the United States
U.S. Route 71
Transportation in Alexandria metropolitan area, Louisiana
Transportation in Rapides Parish, Louisiana
U.S. Route 167